Irene, Princess of Zadrima and Pult (albanian: Jerina Dushmani) was a 15th century Albanian Princess of the Dushmani family that ruled over the north-western part of the country. Her father was Prince Lekë Dushmani, Lord of Zadrima and a participant of the League of Lezhë. The Princess is often compared to Helen of Troy, as her beauty and intelligence caused a great conflict between two albanian Princes : Prince Alexander Ducagini and Prince Alexander Zacharia.

Marin Barleti's version of the conflict 
According to Marin Barleti, Irene preferred Prince Zaharia and might have possibly been betrothed to him, however, this decision was not accepted lightely by Prince Ducagini. 

In 1445 the nobles had been invited to Princess Maria Kastrioti, Skanderbeg's elder sister's, wedding to Musacchio Thopia. As soon as Irene entered the wedding reception hostilities began. Ducagini might have asked her to marry him, but Zacharia, drunk, saw this and assaulted him. Some Princes and nobles attempted to stop the fight, but only more people became involved, resulting in several deaths, until peace was established. Neither of the two antagonists had suffered any physical damage, however Alexander Ducagini was morally humiliated. 

Two years later in 1447, Prince Zaharia would be killed in an ambush and Ducagini was blamed for his murder. Irene refused the proposed marriage after the death of her lover, and lived a closed life as a nun on the island of Sardinia in Italy.  She stated in her last will that her remains were to be taken to Dagnum near the tomb of Prince Lekë Zaharia.

Original Venetian documents contradict Barleti's version by showing that this murder happened in 1444. According to Venetian chronicler Stefano Magno it was Nikollë Dukagjini, Zaharia's vassal, who killed him in the battle, not Lekë as stated by Marin Barleti.

See Also 

Lekë Dukagjini

Lekë Zaharia

Dushmani family

References 

Dushmani family
15th-century Albanian people
Place of birth missing
Year of birth missing
Year of death missing